Nikola Pavličević (born August 11, 1988) is a Montenegrin professional basketball player who plays for Studentski centar of the Montenegrin Basketball League and the ABA League.

References

External links
Profile at aba-liga.com
Profile at eurobasket.com
Profile at realgm.com

1988 births
Living people
ABA League players
BC Zepter Vienna players
KK Lovćen players
KK MZT Skopje players
KK Olimpija players
KK Sutjeska players
KK Studentski centar players
Montenegrin expatriate sportspeople in Austria
Montenegrin expatriate sportspeople in Hungary
Montenegrin expatriate sportspeople in Slovenia
Montenegrin men's basketball players
Sportspeople from Nikšić
Szolnoki Olaj KK players
Point guards